Pissouri is a village located in Limassol’s district, Cyprus (thirty kilometres westwards of Limassol’s centre), between Limassol and Paphos.  Pissouri’s administrative area is the third biggest in Limassol District.  The main settlement of Pissouri is situated about three kilometres away from the bay named Cape Aspro, and is built on the side of a green hill.  The settlement is placed in the middle of Pissouri’s territory.

Now they are two distinct communities, Pissouri Village Area and Pissouri Bay Area. The total permanent population is said to reach around 1100 people, about half of whom are Cypriots, the rest foreigners, mainly British, residents and visitors.

There are several shops, and many tavernas, restaurants and bars in the village. There is also a Bank of Cyprus branch in the village's central square.

Names 
According to some official sources, the name Pissouri derives from the ancient city ‘Voousoura’, as reported by Stravonas, a 1st-century BCE - 1st-century CE philosopher, mathematician and geographer. Some other sources connect the name of the village with pitched-dark nights.

A legend reports that the 300 Alamanoi (German) saints who came to Cyprus from Palestine in order to practice in various parts of the island, arrived on the Pissouri’s coast during such a pitch-dark night. Another legend reports that ‘the Saint Fathers’ pursued during the post-Christian era, were met in Pissouri’s region during a really black-night.  However, it seems that the name of the village does not eventually stem from those legendaries but from the fact that in the region there was an extensive extraction of skin-sap from pine trees (called ‘pissa’ in Greek).  The skin-sap production begun during the Byzantine Empire (Eastern Roman Empire), continued during the Middle-Ages (5th – 15th century) and the Frankish era in Cyprus.

Development and occupation 
Pissouri has an annual rainfall in the order of 447 millimetres. Local products nowadays are tabled grapes, wine, potatoes and other citrus fruits in smaller quantities planted across the valley spanning from the gulf to the hill, where the settlement is.  There are also many olive, carob and almond trees.  Unfortunately, during the last years, farmers had to eradicate big part of their vineyards, as they became profitless.
During the last decade, and in particular the last 6 years, the residents have shifted to alternative financial resources with a better interest profit. Most of them have extensively dealt with buildings' construction and specifically with the erection of numerous residential places and new neighbourhoods. It is a matter of time before the village becomes literally autonomous in terms of services and facilities found locally. Pissouri seems to evolve rapidly, following the trends of the globalisation and global investments'.

Churches
The Church of Apostle Andrea was built with voluntary work by the good-willing residents of the community in 1883. The work for the construction of the church lasted for about twelve years.
The stone that the church is built on 
originates from the regions of villages Anogyra and Prasteio villages and was transferred in the village with carts which were dragged by Cypriot donkeys.
The church is built in Gothic style.
The place that it is built was used as the village cemetery up to 1912.

The church is famous for its wooden-carved Icon Stand, which is a real work of art and was manufactured in 1890. The manufacture lasted 10 entire years because of the means of that time.

Other chapels are: Saint George, Prophet Elias, Saint Alexandros, Saint Mauritius, Saint Spyridonas.

References

External links
Pissouri Community Council
Pissouri Residents Association

Communities in Limassol District